Georgi Kulikov (born 11 June 1947) is a Latvian former butterfly and freestyle swimmer who competed in the 1968 Summer Olympics and in the 1972 Summer Olympics.

External links

1947 births
Living people
Latvian male butterfly swimmers
Latvian male freestyle swimmers
Soviet male butterfly swimmers
Olympic swimmers of the Soviet Union
Swimmers at the 1968 Summer Olympics
Swimmers at the 1972 Summer Olympics
Olympic silver medalists for the Soviet Union
Olympic bronze medalists for the Soviet Union
Olympic bronze medalists in swimming
European Aquatics Championships medalists in swimming
Medalists at the 1972 Summer Olympics
Medalists at the 1968 Summer Olympics
Olympic silver medalists in swimming
Soviet male freestyle swimmers